The twenty-seventh series of Casualty began airing on BBC One on 18 August 2012 with an episode featuring a disaster at a music festival. Filming series 26 was completed in April 2012 and filming series 27 began a week later. The first episode was in the normal formata 50-minute episode. This season is 44 episodes, increasing from 42 for the previous one. Viewing figures for the first episode were  5.19 million viewers, continuing to be one of the most watched programmes of a Saturday night.

This series saw the departures of Dylan Keogh (William Beck), Linda Andrews (Christine Tremarco), Lloyd Asike (Michael Obiora), and long-standing character Nick Jordan (Michael French); as well as the returns of former nurse, now consultant Martin "Ash" Ashford (Patrick Robinson) who last appeared fifteen years previously and former ambulance dispatcher, now receptionist Louise Tyler (Azuka Oforka). This series also saw the introduction of four new student nurses: Ally Hunter (Rebecca Newman), Aoife O'Reilly (Gemma-Leah Devereux), Robyn Miller (Amanda Henderson), and Jamie Collier (Daniel Anthony) - with only the latter two receiving a promotion to staff nurse and continuing into the next series.

Production 
The series commences in the United Kingdom on 18 August 2012 on BBC One and airs on Saturday nights. Nikki Wilson continues her role as series producer, while Johnathan Young serves as the executive producer. The BBC advertised for the role of executive producer at Casualty and Holby City on 15 February 2013. Two weeks later, it was announced that former series producer Oliver Kent had been appointed in the role and would commence work on 11 March 2013. Kent expressed her delight at his appointment, commenting, "I am inheriting two shows in great shape and I can't wait to get started." Kate Harwood, the Head of BBC Drama Production England, praised Kent and opined that he would be "a great new leader" for the dramas.

Episodes run for 50 minutes in length. Previous series have included feature-length episodes, but Wilson explained that the series would not use any feature-length episodes and would instead tell stories over two-part or three-part episodes. She opined that "stories are sustained so well over 50 minutes".

Cast 
The twenty-seventh series of Casualty features a cast of characters working for the NHS within the emergency department of Holby City Hospital and the Holby Ambulance Service. Matt Bardock appears as Jeff Collier, a paramedic, and William Beck portrays Dylan Keogh, a consultant in emergency medicine. Oliver Coleman stars as Tom Kent, an emergency pediatrician, and Charles Dale features as Big Mac, a hospital porter. Jane Hazlegrove plays Kathleen "Dixie" Dixon, a paramedic and the operational duty manager at Holby Ambulance Service. Tony Marshall appears as Noel Garcia, a receptionist, and Michael Obiora portrays Lloyd Asike, a staff nurse. Suzanne Packer features as Tess Bateman, a sister and the department's clinical nurse manager. Charlotte Salt plays Sam Nicholls, a CT2 doctor, and Sunetra Sarker portrays Zoe Hanna, a consultant and the department's acting clinical lead. Original cast member Derek Thompson stars as Charlie Fairhead, a senior charge nurse. Christine Tremarco and Alex Walkinshaw appear as staff nurses Linda Andrews and Adrian "Fletch" Fletcher, respectively.

Gemma Atkinson reprised her role as paramedic Tamzin Bayle in the opening episode. The actress announced her return in May 2012. Producer Nikki Wilson confirmed that Tamzin would appear for a multi-episode story arc and depart at its conclusion. Kate McEvoy appears in a guest stint as cleaner Denise Andrews, the sister of Linda, at the start of the series. Devon Beigan and Taylor Parry also star as Denise's children, Britney Andrews and Joe Andrews, respectively. Tremarco enjoyed working with the trio and praised the children's professionalism. Azuka Oforka joined the regular cast in episode one as receptionist Louise Tyler, having previously appeared in a short stint during series 26.

Paul Bradley, who stars in sister show Holby City as Elliot Hope, appears in episode 7 for a scene with Big Mac. Wilson explained that they wanted to "give audiences that treat" by creating crossovers. Producers reintroduced Amanda Franks (Connie Fisher) for a guest stint in episode 11, following an appearance in series 26. Amanda works as a volunteer in the hospital shop and features in a story with Dylan. Beck left his role as Dylan in 2012 and the character departed in episode 16 at the conclusion of his story.

Wilson announced plans to introduce a group of student nurses to the series in July 2012. The show used their website and social media platforms to promote the characters and their introductions in episode 17. Gemma-Leah Devereux, Amanda Henderson, Daniel Anthony and Rebecca Newman were cast in the roles of Aoife O'Reilly, Robyn Miller, Jamie Collier and Ally Hunter, respectively. All four actors visited a real emergency department to prepare for the role. Newman was cast in a guest role and departed after two episodes, whilst Devereux departed in episode 33.

In January 2013, it was confirmed that Michael French, who portrays consultant Nick Jordan, would return for a four-episode stint, following a temporary departure at the end of the previous series. The return marks his official departure from the show and he exits in episode 22. As part of the return, Rachel Shelley reprised her role as Yvonne Rippon for two episodes, where her character was killed off. Following French's departure, it was announced that Patrick Robinson would reprise his role as Martin "Ash" Ashford, 17 years after he left the series. Ash, who was originally a nurse, returns to the ED as a consultant. Johnathan Young, the show's executive producer, expressed his joy at Robinson's return and hoped Ash's return would "delight viewers old and new". Tremarco departed her role as Linda in episode 35, followed by Obiora's exit from his role as Lloyd in episode 38.

Main characters 

Daniel Anthony as Jamie Collier
Matt Bardock as Jeff Collier
William Beck as Dylan Keogh
Oliver Coleman as Tom Kent
Charles Dale as Big Mac
Gemma-Leah Devereux as Aoife O'Reilly
Michael French as Nick Jordan
Jane Hazlegrove as Kathleen "Dixie" Dixon
Amanda Henderson as Robyn Miller
Tony Marshall as Noel Garcia
Michael Obiora as Lloyd Asike
Azuka Oforka as Louise Tyler
Suzanne Packer as Tess Bateman
Patrick Robinson as Martin "Ash" Ashford
Charlotte Salt as Sam Nicholls
Sunetra Sarker as Zoe Hanna
Derek Thompson as Charlie Fairhead
Christine Tremarco as Linda Andrews
Alex Walkinshaw as Adrian "Fletch" Fletcher

Recurring characters 

Gemma Atkinson as Tamzin Bayle
Devon Beigan as Britney Andrews
Adrian Harris as Norman Burnton
Kate McEvoy as Denise Andrews
Taylor Parry as Joe Andrews
Tahirah Sharif as Ella Ashford

Guest characters 

Gary Cady as Dominic Carter
Connie Fisher as Amanda Franks
Rebecca Newman as Ally Hunter
Rachel Shelley as Yvonne Rippon

Episodes

References
Notes

General

 Titles, credits, airdates and summaries: BBC One - Casualty, Series 27
 Airdates and summaries: 
 Viewing figures: 

Specific

27
2012 British television seasons
2013 British television seasons